The Para Sport - Men's Shot Put F32/34/52 at the 2010 Commonwealth Games as part of the athletics programme was held at the Jawaharlal Nehru Stadium on Thursday 7 October 2010.

Results

External links
2010 Commonwealth Games - Athletics

Men's shot put (F32 34 52)